Mount Brewster is a  mountain summit located in the Vermilion Range of Banff National Park, in the Canadian Rockies of Alberta, Canada. Mount Brewster was named in 1929 by Tom Wilson after John Brewster who was the father of the Brewster family of Banff. 


Geology

The mountains in Banff Park are composed of sedimentary rock laid down during the Precambrian to Jurassic periods. Formed in shallow seas, this sedimentary rock was pushed east and over the top of younger rock during the Laramide orogeny.

Climate

Based on the Köppen climate classification, the mountain experiences a subarctic climate with cold, snowy winters, and mild summers. Temperatures can drop below -20 °C with wind chill factors below -30 °C in the winter.

See also
Geography of Alberta

References

Gallery

External links
 Parks Canada web site: Banff National Park

Two-thousanders of Alberta
Mountains of Banff National Park
Alberta's Rockies